Nematonotus is an extinct genus of prehistoric bony fish that lived during the Lower Cenomanian.

See also

 Prehistoric fish
 List of prehistoric bony fish

References

Aulopiformes
Late Cretaceous fish
Extinct animals of Europe